Larry Weil (June 26, 1951 – April 10, 2017) was an Irish-American professional wrestler, manager and trainer better known under his ring name, "Pretty Boy" Larry Sharpe. Sharpe is perhaps most well-known for creating the Monster Factory professional wrestling school.  He grew up in Castleisland, Ireland and was the original trainer of Kevin Von Erich, and many other well-known wrestlers.

Professional wrestling career
Larry Sharpe was a successful wrestler at Paulsboro High School in New Jersey. He had a record 13–1–1 and was ranked fourth in the NCAA national rankings. In 1974 he was scouted by Red Berry and Gorilla Monsoon who trained him for a life in professional wrestling and later that year Larry made his pro wrestling debut in the WWWF. Larry then toured Japan and various territories including Texas, Florida, Puerto Rico, and the Mid Atlantic.

Sharpe then headed to Canada, where he won his first championship while working for Stampede Wrestling in Calgary, Alberta. Forming a tag team with Ripper Collins, he won the Stampede Wrestling International Tag Team Championship on September 24, 1976. The team held the title for less than one month, dropping it to Ed and Jerry Morrow on October 15. In June 1977, Sharpe returned to the WWWF where he formed a tag team with Dynamite Jack Evans (who was working in the WWWF in preliminary and mid-card matches). The Hollywood Blondes (as they were known) had a successful run winning matches on television and at live events. They impressed Gorilla Monsoon (who owned part of the World Wrestling Council) who sent them down to Puerto Rico for their most successful run.

On December 17, 1977, they defeated Carlos Colón and Victor Jovica to win the WWC North American Tag Team Championship. The title was declared vacant on April 22 the following year because of a controversial match against Jovica and Chief Thunder Cloud. The teams met for a rematch on May 6, and the Hollywood Blondes regained the championship. Three weeks later, however, they lost the title to Colón and Thunder Cloud. Sharpe's next stop was Hawaii where he quickly became the top contender for the NWA Hawaii Heavyweight Championship. In November 1978 when the previous champion, Don Muraco, won the NWA Pacific International Heavyweight Championship, was forced to vacate the Hawaiian championship, Sharpe was awarded the title, later losing it to Mando Guerrero on November 22. After a brief stint in the Mid Atlantic, he returned to the WWF in 1979. He was given a small push by Vince McMahon Sr, but ended up leaving to wrestle independently and open his training school.

The World Famous Monster Factory
The World Famous Monster Factory is a professional wrestling school in Paulsboro, New Jersey, currently run by Danny Cage. It is considered to be the first publicly available professional wrestling school. Sharpe opened the wrestling school with "Nature Boy" Buddy Rogers in 1983 and wrestled part-time until retiring in August 1991. Though Sharpe had trained wrestlers prior to officially opening the school that had significant renown, the school's first famous pupil was Scott "Bam Bam" Bigelow, whose success brought a lot of attention to the school.

In February 2008, the school was threatened by a fire that had started at the building adjacent to the school, ANA Laboratories, and the building was evacuated by the school trainers. The fire was confined to the laboratory until its roof collapsed however, according to Camden County Chief Fire Marshal Paul Hartstein, only a firewall prevented the fire from reaching the school. The school had been in the middle of drills when the fire broke out although all the students were safely evacuated to the outside parking lot.

Sharpe's wrestling students have included:
Tony Atlas
Big Show
Bam Bam Bigelow
D'Lo Brown
Chris Candido
Cliff Compton
Sonjay Dutt
Giant Silva
Barry Hardy
Chris Harris
The Headbangers
King Kong Bundy
Balls Mahoney
Ray Odyssey
The Pitbulls
Raven
Tony Ricca
Rocco Rock
Sheamus
J. T. Southern
Tony Stetson
Bill Irwin
Dirty Dennis Allen
Tatanka
Tank Toland
Virgil
Kevin Von Erich
The Godfather
Mike Gola

Championships and accomplishments
50th State Big Time Wrestling
NWA Hawaii Heavyweight Championship (1 time)
North American Wrestling Federation
NAWF Heavyweight Championship (1 time)
Northeast Championship Wrestling
NCW Heavyweight Championship (1 time)
Northeast Championship Wrestling (Tom Janette)
NCW Heavyweight Championship (2 times)
Stampede Wrestling
Stampede Wrestling International Tag Team Championship – with Ripper Collins
World Wrestling Council
WWC North American Tag Team Championship (2 times) – with Jack Evans

References

External links
Larry Sharpe at Online World of Wrestling
Now It Can Be Told: Those Pro Wrestlers Are Just Having Fun by Peter Kerr

1951 births
2017 deaths
American male professional wrestlers
Professional wrestling trainers
Paulsboro High School alumni
People from Paulsboro, New Jersey
Professional wrestlers from New Jersey
Professional wrestling promoters
Sportspeople from Gloucester County, New Jersey
Deaths from liver disease
Stampede Wrestling alumni
Irish emigrants to the United States
20th-century professional wrestlers
Stampede Wrestling International Tag Team Champions